Baron Baillieu, of Sefton in the Commonwealth of Australia and of Parkwood in the County of Surrey, is a title in the Peerage of the United Kingdom. It was created in 1953 for the businessman and public servant, Sir Clive Baillieu, the son of the Australian financier and politician William Baillieu. Baillieu was Chairman and President of the Dunlop Rubber Company and President of the Federation of British Industries and also worked for the British government during the Second World War.  the title is held by his grandson, the third Baron, who succeeded his father in 1973.

Barons Baillieu (1953)
Clive Latham Baillieu, 1st Baron Baillieu (1889–1967)
William Latham Baillieu, 2nd Baron Baillieu (1915–1973)
James William Latham Baillieu, 3rd Baron Baillieu (b. 1950)

The heir apparent is the present holder's son, Dr the Hon. Robert Latham Baillieu (b. 1979)

Line of Succession

  Clive Latham Baillieu, 1st Baron Baillieu (1889 – 1967)
  William Latham Baillieu, 2nd Baron Baillieu (1915 – 1973)
  James William Latham Baillieu, 3rd Baron Baillieu (born 1950)
 (1) Hon. Robert Latham Baillieu (b. 1979)
 (2) Hon. David Clive Latham Baillieu (b. 1952)
 Hon. Robert Latham Baillieu (1917 – 1999)
 (3) Simon Baillieu (b. 1951)
 (4) James Baillieu (b. 1982)
 (5) Anthony Robert Baillieu (b. 1956)
 Captain Hon. Edward Latham Baillieu (1919 – 2006)
 (6) Christopher Latham Baillieu (b. 1949)
 (7) Charles Latham Baillieu (b. 1985)
 (8) Edward Latham Baillieu (b. 1990)
 (9) Philip Latham Baillieu (b. 1958)

See also
Baillieu family

Notes

References
Kidd, Charles, Williamson, David (editors). Debrett's Peerage and Baronetage (1990 edition). New York: St Martin's Press, 1990, 

Baronies in the Peerage of the United Kingdom
Noble titles created in 1953